The Chekhov Shop is a museum in Taganrog, Russia. This is a two-storey house where the famous Russian writer Anton Chekhov stayed with his family from 1869 to 1874.

The building was built in late 1840s and is located on the crossing of Alexandrovskaya (formerly Monastirskaya Street) and Gogol Street (formerly Yarmarochniy Pereulok). The Chekhov family rented this building from the merchant Ivan Moiseev. The family moved into this building due to commercial interests of Anton Chekhov's father. The shop's entry featured a sign "Tea, sugar, coffee, and other colonial goods".

When Anton's father was away on business, he had to replace him serving as shop assistant and keeping the accounting records. It is on the first floor of this house that the future world-famous playwright wrote his first stories and staged amateur theatricals with other Chekhov family children or with gymnasium fellow students.

November 3, 1977 museum "The Chekhov Shop" was open offering visitors objects and documents related to Chekhov youth years and life of the Chekhov family.

Photographs

References 
 Taganrog Encyclopedia (Энциклопедия Таганрога), 2nd edition, Taganrog, 2003

Museums in Taganrog
Houses completed in 1840
Anton Chekhov
Historic house museums in Russia
Literary museums in Russia
Cultural heritage monuments in Taganrog
Cultural heritage monuments of federal significance in Rostov Oblast